Đỗ (Chữ Hán: 杜) is a Vietnamese family name. According to Lê Trung Hoa, a Vietnamese scholar, approximately 1.4 percent of Vietnamese people have this surname (2005).

Origin
Story tells that , grandson of Thần Nông (Shennong) when passing by Nanling, he met and married a fairy named Đỗ Quý (also known as Princess Đoan Trang, she was often referred as Do Quý Thị (Lady Quý of House of Đỗ). She then gave birth to Tuc Lo, later became Kinh Dương Vương, father of Lạc Long Quân.

Another person that many Vietnamese with this surname claim to be descended from is Đỗ Cảnh Thạc, a warlord during the 12 Lords Rebellion.

Notable Đỗ
 Anh Do - Vietnamese Australian comedian/actor
 Đỗ Anh Vũ (1113–1158), official in the royal court of Lý Anh Tông, the sixth emperor of the Lý Dynasty
 Đỗ Cao Trí (1929–1971), general in the Army of the Republic of Vietnam
 Đỗ Hoàng Điềm (born 1963), Vietnamese democracy advocate
 Khoa Do, Vietnamese Australian actor/director, younger brother of Anh Do
 Đỗ Mậu (1917–2002), general in the Army of the Republic of Vietnam
 Đỗ Minh Quân (born 1984), Vietnamese tennis player
 Đỗ Mười, 20th century politician
 Đỗ Nhuận (1922–1991), Vietnamese classical composer
 Đỗ Thanh Nhơn, 18th century military commander
 Đỗ Thị Hải Yến (born 1982), Vietnamese actress
 Đỗ Thị Minh (born 1988), Vietnamese volleyball player
 Đỗ Thị Hà (born 2001), Miss Vietnam 2020

See also
 Do (surname)

References

 NHỮNG NGƯỜI HỌ ĐỖ 5000 NĂM TRƯỚC (People with surname Đỗ 5000 years ago)

Vietnamese-language surnames

gan:杜姓
ru:Ду (фамилия)
vi:Đỗ
zh:杜姓